Ser Anzoategui is an American actor, best known for portraying Eddy on the Starz drama Vida (2018—2020), and Daysi Cantu on East Los High (2015–2016).

Early life 
Anzoategui was born in Huntington Park, California, and raised in several communities around East Los Angeles. Their parents immigrated to the United States from Argentina and Paraguay. They are non-binary and use they/them pronouns.

Anzoategui attended college at Loyola Marymount University in California.

Career
Anzoategui began acting in the Los Angeles theater scene. They produced, wrote, and starred in a semi-autobiographical play called Catholic School Daze, which led to wider prominence.

When Anzoategui first auditioned for scripted acting roles they were rarely cast even though they presented as femme at the time. They then began to write and perform autobiographical theater shows such as Ser and Catholic School Daze. Anzoategui was performing in theater productions when they were cast in East Los High. They portrayed Daysi Cantu, a character who is masculine of center.

They portrayed Eddy on Vida for the three seasons it ran 2018–2020. Eddy is the sensitive, butch widow of Vidalia, attempts to protect the business she co-owned with her wife when Vida's daughters return for the funeral. Anzoategui's performance on the show has been positively received by critics. Writing for LA Weekly, Lina Lecaro stated, "Powerfully played by L.A. native and longtime local theater actor Ser Anzoategui...Eddy...is in many ways the heart of the show. She conveys a subdued depth of pain, loss and hope while trying to forge a relationship with the young women, even as conflict emerges over how to honor the wishes of the woman who brought them together.

Accolades 
Anzoategui was nominated for “Best Supporting Actor” for their Vida performance at the 2019 Imagen Awards.

Filmography

Television

Film

References

External links 

 Ser Anzoategui on Instagram

Year of birth missing (living people)
Living people
21st-century American actors
American television actors
American stage actors
Hispanic and Latino American actors
American people of Argentine descent
American people of Paraguayan descent
Loyola Marymount University alumni
Actors from California
LGBT people from California
LGBT Hispanic and Latino American people
American non-binary actors